Boris Beravs (Serbian Cyrillic: Борис Беравс; born 12 July 1953) is a retired Yugoslav professional basketball player.

Playing career

Club career
During his professional career, Beravs played most notably for Partizan.

National team career
At the junior level, Beravs won gold at the 1972 European Championship for Juniors in Zadar where he was coached by Mirko Novosel.

At the senior level, Beravs went on to appear eight times for the Yugoslav national team in 1974.

References

External links
 Boris Beravs at fiba.com

1953 births
Living people
Basketball players from Belgrade
Yugoslav men's basketball players
Point guards
KK Sloboda Tuzla players
KK Partizan players
Serbian people of Slovenian descent
Serbian expatriate basketball people in Bosnia and Herzegovina
Serbian men's basketball players